The 2014 Portuguese Socialist Party prime ministerial primary was held on 28 September 2014 and was the first primary open for non members of the Socialist Party and it elected the party's candidate for Prime Minister for the 2015 general election. It's the first time in Portugal that a party has an open primary. There were only two candidates running, António José Seguro current general secretary of the party and António Costa current mayor of Lisbon. António Costa won the primary by a landslide, achieving about 68% of the votes against the 32% of António José Seguro.

After the first results were announced, Seguro conceded defeat and resigned as Secretary-General of the Party.

Background

Following the narrow victory of the Socialist Party over the coalition between the PSD and the CDS-PP in the European elections on 25 May 2014, many Socialist Party members and supporters considered the result a disappointment and many blamed Seguro for not being a real alternative to the Prime Minister Pedro Passos Coelho (PSD). On 27 May, António Costa announced that he would seek the leadership of the Socialist Party.

António José Seguro refused to initiate a leadership contest and accused António Costa of being an opportunist who had broken the deal the two made in early 2013, when António Costa was considering challenging Seguro.

After a bitter meeting of the party leadership members, António Costa included, it was agreed to call a primary election open to supporters of the Socialist Party that would elect the party's candidate for Prime Minister for the following legislative elections in October 2015.

Voting procedures

Calendar
Nominations for the candidacy were opened on 15 July 2014 and closed on 14 August 2014. To be able to vote, voters had to registered between 15 July 2014 and 12 September 2014.

Conditions
Unlike previous Socialist Party leadership elections, this was the first primary to be open to the general public. In order to participate to the open primary, voters had to meet the following conditions:

Members of the party are automatically registered to vote; 
Registered in the Portuguese electoral lists;
Sign a declaration of political principles to the values of the Party: "freedom, equality and solidarity and with the compromise of fighting for human rights, justice and peace.";

Candidates
António José Seguro, Secretary-General of the Socialist Party (2011–2014).
António Costa, Mayor of Lisbon (2007–2015).

Opinion Polling

Results

|- bgcolor="#E9E9E9" align="center"
! colspan="2" align="left" | Candidates
! colspan="2" align="left" | Parties
! width="60" | Votes
! width="30" | %
|-
| bgcolor="" |
| align="left" | António Costa
| align="left" | Socialist Party (Partido Socialista)
| PS
| 120,188
| 67.77
|-
| bgcolor="" |
| align="left" | António José Seguro
| align="left" | Socialist Party (Partido Socialista)
| PS
| 55,928
| 31.54
|-
| colspan="8" bgcolor="#E9E9E9" |
|-
! colspan="4" align="left" | Total Valid
| 176,116
| 99.30
|-
| colspan="6" bgcolor="#E9E9E9" |
|-
| colspan="4" align="left" | Spoilt and null votes ||  || 
|-
| colspan="4" align="left" | Total 
| 177,350
| 100.00
|-
| colspan="4" align="left" | Electorate (eligible voters) and voter turnout 	
| 250,811 	
| 70.71
|-
| colspan="6" bgcolor="#E9E9E9" |
|-
| colspan="6" align="left" | Source: Primárias 2014 Resultados
|}

References

External links
Primárias 2014 Official website
PS Official Website
Official campaign websites
Mobilizar Portugal - António Costa campaign website
Seguro 2015 - António José Seguro campaign website

Primary elections in Portugal
Political party leadership elections in Portugal
2014 elections in Portugal
Portuguese Socialist Party prime ministerial primary